WNAW (1230 AM, "New Country 94.7") is a radio station broadcasting a country music format. Licensed to North Adams, Massachusetts, United States, the station serves northern Berkshire County. The station is owned by Townsquare Media (through licensee subsidiary Townsquare License, LLC), and features programming from ABC News Radio.

In August 2013, Gamma Broadcasting reached a deal to sell its Berkshire County radio stations, including WNAW, to Reed Miami Holdings; the sale was canceled on December 30, 2013. In October 2016, Gamma agreed to sell its stations to Galaxy Communications; that sale also fell through, and in 2017 the stations were acquired by Townsquare Media.

On March 1, 2021, WNAW changed their format from adult contemporary to country, branded as "New Country 94.7" (simulcast on FM translator W234DD 94.7 FM North Adams).

Previous logo

References

External links

NAW
Country radio stations in the United States
North Adams, Massachusetts
Mass media in Berkshire County, Massachusetts
Radio stations established in 1947
1947 establishments in Massachusetts
Townsquare Media radio stations